Novi Sad Airport ( / Aerodrom Novi Sad) , also known as Čenej Airport ( / Aerodrom Čenej), is located near the village of Čenej in Serbia. 
At the moment, the site is mostly used for sport and agriculture.

Novi Sad Airport is expected to be opened for civilian flights soon. The City of Novi Sad  plans to launch civil aviation operations, and connect Novi Sad to airports like Thessaloniki, Tivat, Budapest, Ljubljana, Vienna and others.

It is 16 km (10 mi) north of the city of Novi Sad, on the eastern side of the A1 motorway.

History 
The idea of building an international airport on this site is not new. A 2,500 meters asphalt runway capable of accommodating 70 to 80 seater aircraft is planned. The air corridor above Novi Sad has about 800 movements per day, of which 50 are so-called 'mini-business' flights.
The site also has favourable prevailing winds. Meteorological data for the last 20 years shows the fewest fog affected days in the area per year.

On May 22, 2004, a Let L-410UVP-E Turbolet aircraft with 20 passengers aboard, which had departed from Tivat Airport, landed at the airport. The aircraft belonged to Di Air, a Montenegrin airline. It was a promotional flight aimed at showing interest in developing this airport in the future.

On August 14, 2019 the first international flight landed at Novi Sad Airport.  A German businessman who has a factory in Vojvodina flew in on a Cessna 340, and Novi Sad Flight Club which operates the airfield, did the groundwork for the first international flight.

Development 
On April 5, 2012 Government of Vojvodina decided to develop the airport for civilian traffic. It was planned that the Čenej Airport finish construction of its terminal building by the end of 2015, in order to service passenger, business, low cost and cargo flights.

Provincial authorities originally planned that the airport would open for passenger service in 2015, and upon completion, to use the concept of public-private partnerships to provide additional funding.
The airport is expected look similar to the airport in Tivat, Montenegro.

A model of the airport was presented by the Faculty of Technical Sciences in Novi Sad.
The airport was designed as an airport of "C" type with the outgoing and the incoming terminal, business object, with the control tower, and will occupy an area of about 7 hectares without a runway and internal roads.

Total investment in the airport will be 20 million euros.

The plan is to retain a grass runway for sports aviation and to build a 1,760-meter concrete runway, 30 meters wide for commercial flights. The airport will then bear the 3-C mark, which will be able to land planes with wingspan from 24 to 36 meters and a maximum capacity of about 100 passengers.

See also 
List of airports in Serbia

References

External links 

Airport Novi Sad  - Official web site Airclub Novi Sad - operator of the airport
International Airport Cenej from 2020. -  tangosix.rs
Novi Sad dobija aerodrom - b92.net
Aeromiting na Čeneju 3.6.2007
Novi Sad-Aeromiting-3.juni 2007.
Aeromiting Cenej 2007
Čenej raširio krila - novosti.rs
DI Air Let L-410UVP-E Turbolet on LYNS
Aero Klub Novi Sad
 Brojne pogodnosti
 Srbija će imati 16 malih aerodroma
Novi Sad airport information SMATSA(PDF)

Airports in Serbia
Buildings and structures in Novi Sad
Transport in Novi Sad
Bačka